Wirges is a town in the Westerwaldkreis in Rhineland-Palatinate, Germany.

Geography

Wirges lies in a high hollow in the further Westerwald between Köppel and Malberg, roughly 5 km northwest of Montabaur and 20 km northeast of Koblenz. It was granted town rights in 1975. Wirges is the seat of the Verbandsgemeinde of Wirges, a kind of collective municipality. The people of Wirges call themselves Wirgeser.

Politics

Town council
The council is made up of 22 council members, as well as the honorary and presiding mayor (Stadtbürgermeister), who were elected in a municipal election on 7 June 2009.

Allocation of seats in the municipal council:

Coat of arms
The escutcheon has the shape of a late Gothic round shield with horizontal upper edge and sides meeting it at right angles. The town’s arms are those once borne in days of yore by the Widergis noble family, whose seat was in Wirges.

Town partnerships
Wirges has partnership arrangements with these places:
 Montchanin, Saône-et-Loire, France
 Samobor, Zagreb County, Croatia

Economy and infrastructure

East of the town runs Bundesstraße 255 linking Montabaur and Rennerod. The nearest Autobahn interchange is Montabaur on the A 3 (Cologne–Frankfurt), some 3 km away. The nearest InterCityExpress stop is at Montabaur station on the Cologne-Frankfurt high-speed rail line. The town lies on the Lower Westerwald Railway (Unterwesterwaldbahn) from Limburg to Siershahn.

Sport and culture
SpVgg EGC Wirges’ first team plays in the football Oberliga Südwest; the A-youth have reached the Regionalliga Süd. The men’s second team play in the Rheinlandliga.

The main church is the Westerwälder Dom St. Bonifatius

Furthermore, Wirges has several choirs, a band and a music club.

Notable people
 1926: Kurt Isselbacher, physician
 1951: Gerd Andres, politician

References

Westerwaldkreis